Kainlykovo (Qayınlıq) is a rural locality (a village) and the administrative centre of Kainlykovsky Selsoviet, Burayevsky District, Bashkortostan, Russia. The population was 243 as of 2010. There are 5 streets.

Geography 
Kainlykovo is located 20 km southwest of Burayevo (the district's administrative centre) by road. Saitbayevo is the nearest rural locality.

References 

Rural localities in Burayevsky District